Carla Steinkopf (born 21 July 1973, Maracaibo) is a Venezuelan pageant titleholder. She is the Miss Venezuela International titleholder for 1995, and was the official representative of Venezuela to the Miss International 1996 pageant held in Kanazawa, Japan, on October 26, 1996, when she classified in the Top 15 semifinalists.

Steinkopf competed in the national beauty pageant Miss Venezuela 1995 and obtained the title of Miss Venezuela International. She represented the Costa Oriental.

References

External links
Miss Venezuela Official Website
Miss International Official Website

1973 births
Living people
People from Maracaibo
Miss Venezuela International winners
Miss International 1996 delegates